Shired Island is an unincorporated and largely undeveloped area in Dixie County, Florida, along the Gulf Coast. Shired Island is home to Shired Island Campground, a county park with RV sites, tent sites, and a boat ramp. Shired Island is bordered by Shired Creek and Johnson Creek. The area offshore is highly regarded for fishing. Shired Island is accessible by County Road 357.

References

Unincorporated communities in Dixie County, Florida